{{DISPLAYTITLE:C20H29N5O3}}
The molecular formula C20H29N5O3 (molar mass: 387.47 g/mol, exact mass: 387.2270 u) may refer to:

 Urapidil

Molecular formulas